Naomi Ellen Watts (born 28 September 1968) is a British actress. After her family moved to Australia, she made her film debut there in the drama For Love Alone (1986) and then appeared in three television series, Hey Dad..! (1990), Brides of Christ (1991), and Home and Away (1991), and the film Flirting (1991). After moving to the United States, Watts initially struggled as an actress, taking roles in small-scale films until she starred in David Lynch's psychological thriller Mulholland Drive in 2001 as an aspiring actress. This role started her rise to international prominence.

Watts then played a tormented journalist in the horror remake The Ring (2002).  She was nominated for the Academy Award for Best Actress for her performance as a grief-stricken mother in Alejandro González Iñárritu's film 21 Grams (2003). Her profile continued to grow with starring roles in I Heart Huckabees (2004), King Kong (2005), Eastern Promises (2007), and The International (2009).

For her role as Maria Bennett in the disaster film The Impossible (2012), Watts received another Academy Award nomination for Best Actress. In the 2010s, she starred in such films as Birdman (2014), St. Vincent (2014), While We're Young (2015), The Glass Castle (2017), and Luce (2019). Watts also continued to act in blockbusters, with appearances in the Divergent franchise (2015–2016), and she ventured into television with the Showtime mystery drama series Twin Peaks (2017) and the biographical limited series The Loudest Voice (2019).

Watts is particularly known for her work in remakes and independent productions with dark or tragic themes, as well as portrayals of characters that endure loss or suffering. Magazines such as People and Maxim have included her on their lists of the world's most beautiful women. She has been an ambassador for the Joint United Nations Programme on HIV/AIDS and Pantene's Beautiful Lengths. Despite significant media attention, Watts is reticent about her personal life. From 2005 to 2016 she was in a relationship with American actor Liev Schreiber, with whom she has two sons.

Early life and education 
Naomi Ellen Watts was born on 28 September 1968, in Shoreham, Kent, England. She is the daughter of Myfanwy (Miv) Edwards (née Roberts), an antiques dealer and costume and set designer, and Peter Watts (1946–1976), a road manager and sound engineer who worked with Pink Floyd. Watts's maternal grandfather was Welsh.

Watts's parents divorced when she was four years old. After the divorce, Watts and her elder brother, Ben Watts, moved several times across South East England with their mother. Peter Watts left Pink Floyd in 1974 and remarried in 1976. In August 1976, he was found dead in a flat in Notting Hill, of an apparent heroin overdose.

Following his death, Watts's mother moved the family to Llanfawr Farm in Llangefni and Llanfairpwllgwyngyll, towns on the island of Anglesey in North Wales, where they lived with Watts's maternal grandparents, Nikki and Hugh Roberts, for three years. During this time, Watts attended a Welsh medium school, Ysgol Gyfun Llangefni. She later said of her time in Wales: "We took Welsh lessons in a school in the middle of nowhere while everyone else was taking English. Wherever we moved, I would adapt and pick up the regional accent. It's obviously significant now, me being an actress. Anyway, there was quite a lot of sadness in my childhood, but no lack of love." In 1978, her mother remarried (though she later divorced) and Watts and her brother then moved to Suffolk, where she attended Thomas Mills High School. Watts has stated that she wanted to become an actress after seeing her mother performing on stage and from the time she watched the 1980 film Fame.

In 1982, when Watts was fourteen, she moved to Sydney in Australia with her mother, brother and stepfather. Myfanwy established a career in the burgeoning film business, working as a stylist for television commercials, then turning to costume design, ultimately working for the soap opera Return to Eden. After emigrating, Watts was enrolled in acting lessons by her mother; she auditioned for numerous television advertisements, where she met and befriended actress Nicole Kidman. Watts obtained her first role in the 1986 drama film, For Love Alone, based on the novel of the same name by Christina Stead, and produced by Margaret Fink.

In Australia, Watts attended Mosman High School and North Sydney Girls High School. She failed to graduate from school, afterwards working as a papergirl, a negative cutter and managing a Delicacies store in Sydney's affluent North Shore.

She decided to become a model when she was 18. She signed with a models agency that sent her to Japan, but after several failed auditions, she returned to Sydney. There, she worked in advertising for a department store, which led Follow Me magazine to hire her as an assistant fashion editor. A casual invitation to participate in a drama workshop inspired Watts to quit her job and pursue acting.

Regarding her nationality, Watts has stated: "I consider myself British and have very happy memories of the UK. I spent the first 14 years of my life in England and Wales and never wanted to leave. When I was in Australia I went back to England a lot." She also has expressed her ties to Australia, declaring: "I consider myself very connected to Australia, in fact when people say where is home, I say Australia, because those are my most powerful memories."

Career

Early roles and struggling career (1986–2000)
Watts's career began in television, where she made brief appearances in commercials. The 1986 film For Love Alone, set in the 1930s and based on Christina Stead's 1945 best-selling novel of the same name, marked her debut in film. She then appeared in two episodes of the fourth season of the Australian sitcom Hey Dad..! in 1990. After a five-year absence from films, Watts met director John Duigan during the 1989 premiere of her friend Nicole Kidman's film Dead Calm and he invited her to take a supporting role in his 1991 indie film Flirting. The film received critical acclaim and was featured on Roger Ebert's list of the 10 best films of 1992. Also in 1991, she took the part of Frances Heffernan, a girl who struggles to find friends behind the walls of a Sydney Catholic school, in the award-winning mini-series Brides of Christ and had a recurring role in the soap opera Home and Away as the handicapped Julie Gibson. Watts was then offered a role in the drama series A Country Practice but turned it down, not wanting to "get stuck on a soap for two or three years", a decision she later called "naïve".

Watts then took a year off to travel, visiting Los Angeles and being introduced to agents through Kidman. Encouraged, Watts decided to move to America, to pursue her career further. In 1993 she had a small role in the John Goodman film Matinee and temporarily returned to Australia to star in three Australian films: another of Duigan's pictures, Wide Sargasso Sea; the drama The Custodian; and had her first leading role in the film Gross Misconduct, as a student who accuses one of her teachers (played by Jimmy Smits) of raping her. Watts then moved back to America for good but the difficulty of finding agents, producers and directors willing to hire her during that period frustrated her initial efforts. Though her financial situation never led her to taking a job out of the film industry, she experienced problems like being unable to pay the rent of her apartment and losing her medical insurance. "At first, everything was fantastic and doors were opened to me. But some people who I met through Nicole [Kidman], who had been all over me, had difficulty remembering my name when we next met. There were a lot of promises, but nothing actually came off. I ran out of money and became quite lonely, but Nic gave me company and encouragement to carry on."

She then won a supporting role in the futuristic 1995 film Tank Girl, winning the role of "Jet Girl" after nine auditions. The film was met with mixed reviews and flopped at the box office, although it has gone on to become something of a cult classic. Throughout the rest of the decade, she took mostly supporting roles in films and occasionally considered leaving the business, but: "there were always little bites. Whenever I felt I was at the end of my rope, something would come up. Something bad. But for me it was 'work begets work'; that was my motto." In 1996, she starred alongside Joe Mantegna, Kelly Lynch and J.T. Walsh in George Hickenlooper's action-thriller Persons Unknown; alongside James Earl Jones, Kevin Kilner and Ellen Burstyn in the period drama Timepiece; in Bermuda Triangle, a TV pilot that was not picked up for a full series, where she played a former documentary filmmaker who disappears in the Bermuda Triangle; and as the lead role in Children of the Corn IV: The Gathering, in which children in a small town become possessed under the command of a wrongfully murdered child preacher.

In 1997, she starred in the Australian ensemble romantic drama Under the Lighthouse Dancing starring Jack Thompson and Jacqueline McKenzie. She also played the lead role in the short-lived television series Sleepwalkers. In 1998, she starred alongside Neil Patrick Harris and Debbie Reynolds in the TV film The Christmas Wish, played the supporting role of Giulia De Lezze in Dangerous Beauty, and provided some voice work for Babe: Pig in the City. She said in an interview in 2012, "That really should not be on my résumé! I think that was early on in the day, when I was trying to beef up my résumé. I came in and did a couple days' work of voiceovers and we had to suck on [helium] and then do a little mouse voice. But I was one in a hundred, so I'm sure you would never be able to identify my voice. I probably couldn't either!" In 1999, she played Alice in the romantic comedy Strange Planet and the Texan student Holly Maddux in The Hunt for the Unicorn Killer, which was based on the real life effort to capture Ira Einhorn, who was charged with Maddux's murder. In 2000, while David Lynch was expanding the rejected pilot of Mulholland Drive into a feature film, Watts starred alongside Derek Jacobi, Jack Davenport and Iain Glen in the BBC TV film The Wyvern Mystery, an adaptation of the novel of the same name by Sheridan Le Fanu that was broadcast in March of that year.

Much of her early career is filled with near misses in casting, as she was up for significant roles in films such as 1997's The Postman and The Devil's Advocate and 2000's Meet the Parents, which eventually went to other actresses. In an interview in 2012, Watts said, "I came to New York and auditioned at least five times for Meet the Parents. I think the director liked me but the studio didn't. I heard every piece of feedback you could imagine, and in this case, it was 'not sexy enough'." Watts recalled her early career in an interview in 2002, saying, "It is a tough town. I think my spirit has taken a beating. The most painful thing has been the endless auditions. Knowing that you have something to offer, but not being able to show it, is so frustrating. As an unknown, you get treated badly. I auditioned and waited for things I did not have any belief in, but I needed the work and had to accept horrendous pieces of shit." Watts studied the Meisner Technique.

Rise to fame (2001–2002)

In 1999, director David Lynch began casting for his psychological thriller Mulholland Drive. He interviewed Watts after looking at her headshot, without having seen any of her previous work, and offered her the lead role. Lynch later said about his selection of Watts, "I saw someone that I felt had a tremendous talent, and I saw someone who had a beautiful soul, an intelligence—possibilities for a lot of different roles, so it was a beautiful full package." Conceived as a pilot for a television series, Lynch shot a large portion of it in February 1999, planning to keep it open-ended for a potential series. However, the pilot was rejected. Watts recalled thinking at the time, "just my dumb luck, that I'm in the only David Lynch programme that never sees the light of day." Instead, Lynch filmed an ending in October 2000, turning it into a feature film which was picked up for distribution.

Mulholland Drive, also starring Laura Harring and Justin Theroux, premiered at the 2001 Cannes Film Festival to high critical acclaim and marked Watts's breakthrough. Reviewing her performance, Peter Bradshaw of The Guardian stated that "Watts's face metamorphoses miraculously from fresh-faced beauty to a frenzied, teary scowl of ugliness."; Emanuel Levy wrote, "... Naomi Watts, in a brilliant performance, a young, wide-eyed and grotesquely cheerful blonde, full of high hopes to make it big in Hollywood." The film received a large number of awards and nominations, including the Best Actress Award for Watts from the National Society of Film Critics and a nomination for Best Actress from the American Film Institute. The surrealist film following the story of the aspiring actress Betty Elms, played by Watts, sparked controversy over its strong lesbian theme.

Also in 2001, she starred in two short films, Never Date an Actress and Ellie Parker, and the horror film The Shaft, director Dick Maas's remake of his 1983 film De Lift. In 2002, she starred in one of the biggest box office hits of that year, The Ring, the English language remake of the Japanese horror film Ring. Directed by Gore Verbinski, the film, which also starred Martin Henderson and Brian Cox, received favourable reviews and grossed around US$129 million domestically (equivalent to US$ million in ). Watts portrayed Rachel Keller, a journalist investigating the strange deaths of her niece and other teenagers after watching a mysterious videotape, and receiving a phone call announcing their deaths in seven days. Her performance was praised by critics, including Paul Clinton of CNN.com, who stated that she "is excellent in this leading role, which proves that her stellar performance in Mulholland Drive was not a fluke. She strikes a perfect balance between skepticism and the slow realisation of the truth in regard to the deadly power of the videotape." That year, she also starred in Rabbits, a series of short films directed by David Lynch; alongside several other famous British actors in the black comedy Plots with a View; and with Tim Daly in the western The Outsider.

Established career (2003–2007)
In 2003, Watts took the part of Julia Cook in Gregor Jordan's Australian film Ned Kelly opposite Heath Ledger, Orlando Bloom and Geoffrey Rush; as well as starring in the Merchant-Ivory film Le Divorce, portraying Roxeanne de Persand, a poet who is pregnant and abandoned by her husband Charles-Henri de Persand. Roxeanne and her sister Isabel (played by Kate Hudson) dispute the ownership of a painting by Georges de La Tour with the family of Charles-Henri's lover. Entertainment Weekly gave the film a "C" rating and lamented Watts's performance: "I'm disappointed to report that Hudson and Watts have no chemistry as sisters, perhaps because Watts never seems like the expatriate artiste she's supposed to be playing".

Conversely, her performance opposite Sean Penn and Benicio del Toro in director Alejandro González Iñárritu's 2003 drama 21 Grams earned Watts numerous award nominations, including an Academy Award nomination for Best Actress, later that year. In the story, told in a non-linear manner, she portrayed Cristina Peck, a grief-stricken woman living a suburban life after the killing of her husband and two children by Jack Jordan (Benicio del Toro), who became involved in a relationship with the critically ill academic mathematician Paul Rivers (Sean Penn). She has said of the nomination, "It's far beyond what I ever dreamed for – that would have been too far fetched". The New York Times praised her: "Because Ms. Watts reinvents herself with each performance, it's easy to forget how brilliant she is. She has a boldness that comes from a lack of overemphasis, something actresses sometimes do to keep up with Mr. Penn". The San Francisco Chronicle wrote: "Watts is riveting, but she's much better in scenes of extreme emotion than in those requiring subtlety."

In 2004, Watts starred alongside Mark Ruffalo in the independent film We Don't Live Here Anymore, based on short stories by Andre Dubus, which depicts the crisis of two married couples, reunited with Sean Penn in The Assassination of Richard Nixon, playing the wife of the would-be presidential assassin Samuel Byck (Penn), and teamed up with Jude Law and Dustin Hoffman in David O. Russell's ensemble comedy I Heart Huckabees. She headlined and produced the semi-autobiographical drama Ellie Parker (2005), which depicted the struggle of an Australian actress in Hollywood. The film began as a short film that was screened at the Sundance Film Festival in 2001 and was expanded into a feature-length production over the next four years. Film critic Roger Ebert praised Watts's performance: "The character is played by Watts with courage, fearless observation and a gift for timing that is so uncanny it can make points all by itself."

Watts starred in the sequel to The Ring, The Ring Two (2005), which despite a negative critical response, made over US$161 million worldwide gross (equivalent to US$ million in ). In 2005, Watts also headlined the remake of King Kong as Ann Darrow. She was the first choice for the role, portrayed by Fay Wray in the original film, with no other actors considered. In preparation for her role, Watts met with Wray, who was to make a cameo appearance and say the final line of dialogue, but she died during pre-production at the age of 96. King Kong proved to be Watts's most commercially successful film yet. Helmed by The Lord of the Rings director Peter Jackson, the film won high praise and grossed US$550 million worldwide (equivalent to US$ million in ). The Seattle Post-Intelligencer praised her performance: "The third act becomes a star-crossed, "Beauty and the Beast" parable far more operatic and tragic than anything the original filmmakers could have imagined, exquisitely pantomimed by Watts with a poignancy and passion that rates Oscar consideration." Alongside the movie, she reprised her role as Darrow in the video game adaptation of King Kong, for which her voice performance garnered her significant praise, leading to a nomination for a Spike Video Game Award for Best Performance by a Female. Watts and the other game's cast members also won an award for Best Cast. Her other 2005 film release was Marc Forster's psychological thriller Stay, alongside Ewan McGregor, Ryan Gosling and Bob Hoskins. At this point in her career, Watts stated the following:

The romantic drama The Painted Veil (2006), with Edward Norton and Liev Schreiber, featured Watts as the daughter of a lawyer who marries a man for his reputation as a physician and bacteriologist. Comparing her portrayal with Greta Garbo's in the original movie, the San Francisco Chronicle wrote "Watts makes the role work on her own terms – her Kitty is more desperate, more foolish, more miserable and more driven . . . and her spiritual journey is greater. Watts also provided the voice of a small role, Suzie Rabbit, in David Lynch's psychological thriller Inland Empire. That year, she was announced as the new face of the jewellers David Yurman and completed a photoshoot which was featured in the 2007 Pirelli Calendar.

Watts portrayed a Russian-British midwife who delivers the baby of a drug-addicted 14-year old prostitute in David Cronenberg's Eastern Promises (2007), with Viggo Mortensen. In its review, Slate magazine observed that she "brings a wounded radiance to the overcurious midwife Anna. Though it's a bit of a one-note role, it's a note she's long specialised in, a kind of flustered moral aggrievement". Eastern Promises grossed US$56 million worldwide, (equivalent to US$ million in ). She was one of the producers and starred as a mother who, along with her family, are held hostage by a pair of sociopathic teenagers in Michael Haneke's Funny Games (also 2007), a remake of Haneke's 1997 film of the same name. The director said that he agreed to make the film on condition that he be allowed to cast Watts, according to UK's The Daily Telegraph, but it went largely unnoticed by critics and audiences. Nevertheless, Newsweek felt that Watts "hurls herself into her physically demanding role with heroic conviction".

Biographical and independent films (2009–2014)
After a short hiatus from acting following the birth of her two children, Watts returned to acting in 2009, starring alongside Clive Owen in the political action thriller The International, in which she played a Manhattan assistant district attorney who partners with an Interpol agent to take down a merchant bank. The production was a moderate commercial success, grossing over US$60 million (equivalent to $ million in ) worldwide. She next appeared in the drama Mother and Child, portraying the role of a lawyer who never knew her biological mother. ViewLondon found her to be "terrific as [her character], delivering a powerful performance that [...] isn't afraid to be unsympathetic". She was nominated for the Best Actress award at the Australian Film Institute Awards and for the Independent Spirit Award for Best Supporting Female.

Her next film, the Woody Allen dramedy You Will Meet a Tall Dark Stranger, opened at the 2010 Cannes Film Festival, and saw her portray Sally, a woman who has a troubled marriage with author Roy (played by Josh Brolin). It made over US$26 million (equivalent to $ million in ). Her portrayal of Valerie Plame in the biographical thriller Fair Game followed, and marked the third pairing of Watts with Sean Penn after 21 Grams and The Assassination of Richard Nixon. The film earned Watts a Satellite Award nomination for Best Actress. In 2011, she appeared with Daniel Craig and Rachel Weisz in Jim Sheridan's psychological horror film Dream House, as the neighbour of a murdered family, and with Leonardo DiCaprio in Clint Eastwood's biographical drama J. Edgar, playing secretary Helen Gandy. While Dream House flopped,  J. Edgar had a more favorable reception.

Watts starred in The Impossible (2012), a disaster drama based on the true story of María Belón and her family's experience of the 2004 Indian Ocean tsunami; she played the lead role, with her name changed to Maria Bennett. The film was a critical darling, had the highest-grossing opening weekend for a film in Spain, and made US$180.2 million (equivalent to $ million in ) globally. Deborah Young of The Hollywood Reporter stated that "Watts packs a huge charge of emotion as the battered, ever-weakening Maria whose tears of pain and fear never appear fake or idealised," while Justin Chang of Variety magazine remarked that she "has few equals at conveying physical and emotional extremis, something she again demonstrates in a mostly bedridden role." Damon Wise of The Guardian felt that "Watts is both brave and vulnerable, and her scenes with the young Lucas [...] are among the film's best." Watts went on to be nominated for the Academy Award, Golden Globe and Screen Actors Guild Award for Best Actress.

In Adore (2013), Watts starred with Robin Wright as two childhood friends who fall in love with each other's sons. On the film, critics concluded that Watts and Wright "give it their all, but they can't quite make Adore'''s trashy, absurd plot believable". She obtained the FCCA Award for Best Actress in 2014 for her role. The anthology comedy Movie 43 (2013) featured Watts as a devoted mother, alongside Liev Schreiber. Movie 43 was universally panned by critics, with Richard Roeper calling it "the Citizen Kane of awful".

In Laurie Collyer's independent drama Sunlight Jr. (2013), Watts starred with Matt Dillon as a struggling working-class couple. The San Francisco Chronicle, praising Watts and Dillon, wrote in its review for the film that they are "formidable actors at the top of their game here [...] exhibiting a remarkable chemistry". Watts portrayed the title role in Oliver Hirschbiegel's Diana (her final film released in 2013), a biographical drama about the last two years of the life of Diana, Princess of Wales. Released amid much controversy given its subject, the film was a critical flop. James Berardinelli found the film to be a "dull, pointless" production and remarked that while Watts did a "decent job encapsulating the look and feel of Diana", her portrayal was "a two-dimensional recreation".

Alejandro González Iñárritu's dark comedy Birdman or (The Unexpected Virtue of Ignorance) (2014) featured Watts as the actress of a play mounted by a faded Hollywood actor (played by Michael Keaton). The film was the subject of widespread acclaim, and won four awards at the 87th Academy Awards including Best Picture; Watts and the other cast members earned the Screen Actors Guild Award for Outstanding Cast in a Motion Picture.  Her other two awaiting projects were screened at the 2014 Toronto International Film Festival. The dramedy St. Vincent starred Watts as a Russian prostitute. She learnt the accent by spending time with Russian women in a West Village spa during a six-week period. Los Angeles Times reported a dividing reaction towards her performance, asserting that her part "put off some critics with its outrageousness", but "earned plenty of plaudits too". Watts nabbed a Screen Actors Guild Award nomination for Outstanding Supporting Actress. In While We're Young, Watts starred with Ben Stiller as a New York City-based married couple who begin hanging out with a couple in their 20s. That film was an arthouse success and Watts received praise for her on-screen chemistry with Stiller.

Film and television work (2015–present)

Watts played rebel leader Evelyn Johnson-Eaton in Insurgent (2015), the second film in The Divergent Series, which is based on Veronica Roth's best-selling young adult novel of the same name. Despite mixed reviews, the film was a commercial success, grossing US$274.5 million worldwide. Watts reprised her role in the series's third instalment, Allegiant, released on 18 March 2016, to negative reviews and lackluster box office sales.

Watts starred in Gus Van Sant's mystery drama The Sea of Trees, opposite Matthew McConaughey, as the wife of an American man who attempts suicide in Mount Fuji's "Suicide Forest". The film premiered at the 2015 Cannes Film Festival where it competed for the Palme d'Or, but was heavily panned by both critics and audiences, who reportedly booed and laughed during its screening. Critic Richard Mowe stated the audience reaction should "give the film's creative team pause for reflection about exactly where they went so badly awry." Justin Chang of Variety also criticised the film, but commended Watts's performance for being "solidly moving and sometimes awesomely passive-aggressive." The Sea of Trees did not find an audience in theaters.

Like St. Vincent and While We're Young the previous year, Watts had two starring vehicles —Demolition and Three Generations— screening at the Toronto International Film Festival, in 2015. In Demolition, directed by Jean-Marc Vallée and opposite Jake Gyllenhaal, Watts played a customer service representative and the interest of a grieving investment banker (Gyllenhaal). The Wrap felt that she "empathetically captures [her] harried single mom" role as she played "both the wit and the sadness with grace". In Three Generations, directed by Gaby Dellal, she appeared with Susan Sarandon and Elle Fanning as the mother of a young transgender man (Fanning). Pulled from the schedule days before its intended initial release, the film subsequently opened on selected theatres in May 2017.

Watts played Linda, the second wife of heavyweight boxer Chuck Wepner (played by Liev Schreiber) in the biographical sport drama The Bleeder (2016), revolving around the life of Wepner and his 1975 fight with Muhammad Ali. Variety wrote in its review: "Slightly out of place as the feisty bartender who gives Wepner a second chance at his downest and outest, a spirited Naomi Watts nonetheless gives proceedings her best Amy Adams in The Fighter." She headlined the thriller Shut In (also 2016), playing a psychologist isolated with her child in a rural house during a winter storm. The film received largely negative reviews and made US$8 million worldwide.

Watts appeared in Twin Peaks, a limited event television series and a continuation of the 1990 show of the same name. It was broadcast on Showtime in 2017, to critical acclaim. Watts starred as "a therapist who begins to develop dangerous and intimate relationships with the people in her patients' lives" in the Netflix drama series Gypsy (also 2017), and served as one of its executive producers. While response was mixed, Gypsy was cancelled by Netflix after one season. In The Book of Henry (2017), Watts portrayed the mother of young genius who plans save the girl next door from abuse. The film polarized critics and audiences, but Rolling Stone described her as "a plus in any movie" and found her to be "excellent" in the role. In her other 2017 film, The Glass Castle opposite Brie Larson, and Woody Harrelson. An adaptation of Jeannette Walls's best selling memoir of the same name, Watts played the nonconformist mother of the author.

In 2019, Watts portrayed Gretchen Carlson in the Showtime miniseries The Loudest Voice based on the book The Loudest Voice in the Room about Roger Ailes's sexual harassment of Carlson. She next starred in the films Penguin Bloom, Boss Level, and This Is The Night.

In 2022, Watts played a lead in Netflix's The Watcher as Nora Brannock alongside Bobby Cannavale, who played Dean Brannock.

 Other work 
Watts received an endorsement deal with David Yurman jewelry. She served as the ambassador to Thierry Mugler's Angel fragrance from 2008 until 2011 when Eva Mendes overtook the role. The pair later coincidentally fronted a campaign for Pantene hair care products. Watts also appeared in a campaign for Ann Taylor in 2010. She was announced as a new 'face' of L'Oréal in 2014. Watts also founded the skincare company Onda Beauty in 2016 and appeared in a campaign for Fendi in 2020.

In January 2021, it was announced that Watts was an early investor in Thirteen Lune, an e-commerce site focused on makeup, skincare, haircare and wellness products owned by people of color and ally brands.

Philanthropy
In 2006, Watts became a goodwill ambassador for Joint United Nations Programme on HIV/AIDS, which helps raise awareness of issues relating to the disease. She has used her high profile and celebrity to bring attention to the needs of people living with this disease. Watts has featured in campaigns for fundraising, events and activities, including the 21st Annual AIDS Walk. On 1 December 2009, Watts met United Nations Secretary-General Ban Ki-moon at a public event commemorating World AIDS Day 2009.

In 2011, Watts attended a charity polo match in New York City along with Australian actors Hugh Jackman and Isla Fisher, which was intended to raise money to help victims of the 2010 Haiti earthquake. In 2012, she became an  ambassador for Pantene's Beautiful Lengths, a programme that donates real-hair wigs to women with cancer. She has visited the St Vincent's Hospital in Sydney to meet some of the women the programme helps.

In 2016, Watts collaborated with Sportscraft and children's charity Barnardos to produce a range of namesake coats, with a percentage of sales going to the charity, and was one of the public figures photographed by Italian photographer Fabrizio Ferri for Bulgari's digital campaign "Raise Your Hand". In November 2018, she hosted the Worldwide Orphans 14th Annual Gala in NYC, and teamed up with McDonald's, to serve as a McHappy Day ambassador, making a special appearance and stepping behind the counter in Haberfield, Sydney.

Personal life

Watts converted to Buddhism after having gained an interest in that religion during the shooting of The Painted Veil (2006), and became a strong proponent of Transcendental Meditation.

Watts had a relationship with Australian actor Heath Ledger from August 2002 to May 2004. In 2005, Watts began a relationship with American actor Liev Schreiber. Their first child, son Alexander 'Sasha' Pete, was born in 2007, and their second son, Samuel Kai, was born in 2008. On 26 September 2016, Watts and Schreiber announced their split after 11 years together. Since 2017, Naomi has been dating American actor Billy Crudup after they met on the set of the Netflix drama series Gypsy''.

In 2016, Watts became the honorary president of Glantraeth F.C., a small football club in Malltraeth, Anglesey, Wales, near her grandparents' farm, where she spent time as a child.

Filmography and accolades

See also
List of British actors
List of British Academy Award nominees and winners
List of actors with Academy Award nominations
List of actors with two or more Academy Award nominations in acting categories

References

External links

 
 
 Naomi Watts at UNAIDS.org
 

1968 births
Living people
20th-century British actresses
21st-century British actresses
Actresses from Kent
Actresses from Sydney
British Buddhists
British emigrants to Australia
British expatriate actresses in Australia
British expatriate actresses in the United States
British film actresses
British film producers
British people of Welsh descent
British stage actresses
British television actresses
British voice actresses
Converts to Buddhism
HIV/AIDS activists
Outstanding Performance by a Cast in a Motion Picture Screen Actors Guild Award winners
People educated at North Sydney Girls High School
People educated at Ysgol Gyfun Llangefni
People from Shoreham, Kent